The following is a list of settlements in Sri Lanka. See also: List of towns in Sri Lanka, a list of settlements in Sri Lanka with a population between 5,000 and 50,000.

Central Province

Eastern Province

North Central Province

Northern Province

North Western Province

Sabaragamuwa

Southern Province

Uva

Western Province

 
Settlements